Vitas Gerulaitis defeated John Lloyd in the final, 6–3, 7–6, 5–7, 3–6, 6–2 to win the men's singles tennis title at the December 1977 Australian Open.

Roscoe Tanner was the defending champion, but lost in the first round to Chris Lewis.

Seeds
The seeded players are listed below. Vitas Gerulaitis is the champion; others show the round in which they were eliminated.

   Vitas Gerulaitis (champion)
   Roscoe Tanner (first round)
   Tony Roche (first round)
   Ken Rosewall (quarterfinals)
   Phil Dent (second round)
   John Alexander (semifinals)
   Stan Smith (third round)
   Tim Gullikson (third round)

Qualifying

Draw

Key
 Q = Qualifier
 WC = Wild card
 LL = Lucky loser
 r = Retired

Final eight

Section 1

Section 2

Section 3

Section 4

External links
 Australian Open (December 1977) on ATPWorldTour.com
 1977 Australian Open (December) – Men's draws and results at the International Tennis Federation

Mens singles
Australian Open (tennis) by year – Men's singles